Michael III was the Byzantine emperor in 842–867.

Michael III may also refer to:

 Pope Michael III of Alexandria, ruled in 880–907
 Michael III of Constantinople, ruled in 1170–1178
 Michael III of Duklja, Prince of Duklja, from c. 1170 to 1186

See also
 Michael (disambiguation)